Pyrausta childrenalis is a moth in the family Crambidae. It was described by Jean Baptiste Boisduval in 1833. It is found on Réunion and Madagascar.

References

Moths described in 1833
childrenalis
Moths of Africa